Terrible One is a bicycle company founded in 1998 in Austin, Texas, United States, by BMX professionals Joe Rich and Taj Mihelich. It produces BMX frames, parts and softgoods. Over the years it gained high reputation especially amongst seasoned riders. It sponsors freestyle BMX riders worldwide.

Background 
The original Terrible One, or T1, team was Joseph North Rich, Taj Mihelich, Paul Buchanan and Robbie Morales. They produced two frames; the Barcode which was designed by Rich and Mihelich, based on the frame Taj designed while riding for Hoffman Bikes, and as the Progression, a lighter trails frame designed by Morales. When Morales left to create Fit Bike Co., he took the Progression design with him.

Recent history 
T1 produced signature versions of the Barcode for riders it sponsored. Garrett Byrnes, Scott Malyon, Nate Wessel and Joe Rich all had one. All had the original Barcode's shape seat-stay junction, neither a wishbone-junction nor a traditional A-frame .

T1 expanded its line when Spanish BMX rider Ruben Alcantara joined the team. In 2004 T1 produced a new frame for Alcantara, lighter than the Barcode and with a different shape and a press-fit bottom-bracket. For 2005 T1 introduced a new double-diamond frame for Garrett Byrnes and incorporated an integrated headset for all their frames. In 2007 it made the 5-a-day, a lightweight street frame used by Danny Hickerson and Joel Moody. T1 also made a refined Garrett Byrnes frame in 2007, the S.F.A.

Taj Mihelich left to join Giant Bicycles. In an interview with The Albion BMX Magazine, Taj cited his decision for leaving as he was no longer friends with Joe Rich. He stated that he gave his share of the company to Joe and mentioned the two are no longer on speaking terms. Taj went on to found Fairdale Bikes, part of the same group as the Odyssey and Sunday BMX brands.

Art Direction

Terrible One's artwork is by a local artist, Michael Sieben, who directs art at Roger Skateboards and contributes to Thrasher magazine.

References

External links
Official site

Cycle manufacturers of the United States
BMX
Companies established in 1998